Lily Brooks-Dalton is an American writer. She was born and raised in southern Vermont. Her first book, Motorcycles I've Loved: A Memoir, published in 2015 by Riverhead, was a finalist for the Oregon Book Award. Her first novel, Good Morning, Midnight, was published the next year by Random House, and it has been translated into half a dozen languages, with a film adaptation as The Midnight Sky in December 2020 starring and directed by George Clooney.

Brooks-Dalton earned a BA at the University of Massachusetts Amherst and a MFA at Portland State University.

Works 
 Motorcycles I've Loved: A Memoir. Riverhead/Penguin Random House, New York 2014, .
 Quartz and Other Stories. (Master-Thesis, Portland State University). Portland, Oregon 2016 (pdx.edu).
 Good Morning, Midnight. Random House, New York 2016, .
 The Light Pirate. Grand Central Publishing, New York 2022. .

References

External links
Official website

Writers from Vermont
University of Massachusetts Amherst alumni
Portland State University alumni
21st-century American non-fiction writers
21st-century American women writers
21st-century American novelists
American women non-fiction writers
Women science fiction and fantasy writers
American science fiction writers
Year of birth missing (living people)
Living people
People from Brattleboro, Vermont